Chandrabhoga Gadhi is a historical ruins fort located in Shambhunath, Saptari District, Nepal. The ruins fort is located in the Rupani- Shambhunath Chure hill section north west of Kanakpatti village around 4 km. The hill fort was originally built by the Senas of Makwanpur in the 15th century. The temple of Chandrabhoga- clan deity of Sena was built by 27th Sena King Chandrasen. The fort is locally known as Chanarbhoga Gadhi and is believed to be the remnants of the Ekagarh, the palace of Sen Kings during winter season.

History
The historical gadhi was believed to be made by King Chandrasen. The Senas of Bengal was enter Nepal in early 13th century from eastern part. The place Rupnagar in Saptari district was the earliest capital seat of Sena Kings of Nepal region. After the settlement in the Saptari district, they expanded their rule towards the Makawanpur in late 13th century. Finally, the kingdom of Senas was ended by the rising power of Gorkhalis in 18th century.

Religious significance
In the first month of the Nepali Calendar, Baishakh the local people visit the place and sacrifice a goat to the deity Chanarbhoga.

Gallery

References

Forts in Nepal
Buildings and structures in Saptari District
15th-century establishments in Nepal